Basil Wright (12 June 1907, Sutton, Surrey – 14 October 1987, Frieth, Buckinghamshire, England) was a documentary filmmaker, film historian, film critic and teacher.

Biography
After leaving Sherborne School, a well known independent school in the market town of Sherborne in Dorset, Basil Wright was the first recruit to join John Grierson at the Empire Marketing Board's film unit in 1930, shortly after he graduated from Cambridge University. Wright's 1934 film Song of Ceylon is his most celebrated work. Shot on location in Ceylon (now Sri Lanka) the film was completed with the composer Walter Leigh at the GPO Film Unit in London. At the GPO, Wright acted as producer and wrote the script for Night Mail (1936) for which he received a joint directorial credit with Harry Watt. Wright had introduced his friend W. H. Auden to the film unit and the poet's verse was included in the film.

Wright left the GPO to form his own production company, The Realist Film Unit (RFU). There he directed Children at School with money from the Gas Industry and The Face of Scotland for The Films of Scotland Committee.

During World War II, Wright worked only as a producer, first at John Grierson's Film Centre before joining The Crown Film Unit between 1945 and 1946 as producer-in-charge. Among the best known films he produced for Crown are Humphrey Jennings' A Diary for Timothy (1946) and A Defeated People (1946) and Instruments of the Orchestra (1946) featuring Benjamin Britten's The Young Person's Guide to the Orchestra. Returning to direction in the early 1950s, his films included Waters of Time (1951) made for the Festival of Britain, World Without End (1953) directed with Paul Rotha for UNESCO and Greece: The Immortal Land (1958) in collaboration with his friend the artist Michael Ayrton.

Writing throughout the 30s and 40s, Basil Wright had contributed to the theoretical development of documentary in the movement's journals Cinema Quarterly, World Film News and Documentary Newsletter. He was the film critic for The Spectator after Graham Greene left. Wright was a regular contributor to the British Film Institute's Sight and Sound during the 1940s and '50s. He published a small book: The Uses of Film (1948) and his personal (extensive) history of cinema The Long View (1974). He taught at the University of Southern California (1962 and 1968), The National Film and Television School in London (1971–73) and Temple University in Philadelphia (1977–78). He was Governor of the British Film Institute, a fellow of the British Film Academy and President of the International Association of Documentary Filmmakers.

In his films Wright combined an ability to look closely and carefully at a subject with a poetic and often experimental approach to editing and sound.  In Britain he is commemorated with a film prize awarded biennially by the Royal Anthropological Institute.

Centenary celebrations
In honour of Basil Wright's centenary year, his career, and the careers of his colleagues and fellow centenarians: Edgar Anstey, Marion Grierson, Humphrey Jennings and Paul Rotha, were celebrated with a season of films between August and October 2007 at the British Film Institute in London. Following this season, the BFI released a four-disc DVD set Land of Promise, containing films from leading figures in the British Documentary Film movement. A further three volumes of GPO films are available from the Bfi.

Films by Basil Wright online

You can watch Song of Ceylon on the Colonial Film: Moving Images of the British Empire Website here:  Entry for Basil Wright's Song of Ceylon.

If you have institutional access to the British Film Institute's Screenonline or Inview Websites you can watch a number of Wright's other films online. Further links below.

Filmography as director
 Conquest (1930)
The Country Comes To Town  *Bfi's Screenonline links to the Film. 
O'er Hill and Dale  *Bfi's Screenonline links to the Film. 
Liner Cruising South
Cargo From Jamaica
Windmill in Barbados
Song of Ceylon (1934) * Available on the Bfi Addressing The Nation DVD Boxset *Or Watch Online at the Colonial Film Website
Children at School    *Available on the BFI Land of Promise DVD Boxset
The Face of Scotland (1938)  *Available from Scottish Screen
Bernard Miles on Gun Dogs
Waters of Time (1951) * Available from Museum in Docklands, London
World Without End (Co-directed with Paul Rotha).
The Stained Glass at Fairford  *Watch at the Arts Council Film Collection
Greece: The Immortal Land (1959)
Greek Sculpture: 3000 BC to 300 BC (1959)
A Place For Gold (1960)

Selected filmography as producer
 The Fairy of the Phone (1936) (* Available on the Bfi We Live in Two Worlds DVD Boxset)
 Night Mail (1936) (* Available on DVD from the Bfi)
 Rainbow Dance (1936)
 Men of Africa (1940)
 The Harvest Shall Come (1942)
 London Scrapbook (1942)
 A Diary for Timothy (1945)
 A Defeated People (1946)
 Children on Trial (1946)

See also
W. H. Auden
Michael Ayrton
Edgar Anstey
Benjamin Britten
Charles Burnett (director)
Alberto Cavalcanti
John Grierson
Robert Flaherty
Humphrey Jennings
Walter Leigh
Muir Mathieson
Bernard Miles
Paul Rotha
Harry Watt

References

 Scott Anthony & James Mansell (eds), The Projection of Britain: A History of the GPO Film Unit, BFI/Palgrave, (2011). 
 Ian Aitken, The Documentary Film Movement: An Anthology, Edinburgh University Press (1998).
 Martin Stollery, Alternative Empires: European Modernist Cinemas and the Cultures of Imperialism, University of Exeter Press (2000).
 Basil Wright, The Uses of Film, Bodley Head, Oxford (1948).
 Basil Wright,  The Long View: An International History of Cinema, Secker & Warburg, London (1974, updated second printing 1976).

External links

BFI Screenonline entry
Oxford Dictionary of National Biography entry
Royal Anthropological Institute entry
Films from the Arts Council Film Collection
Link to Scott Anthony's Night Mail book
Imperial War Museum Interview

1907 births
1987 deaths
People educated at Sherborne School
Alumni of Corpus Christi College, Cambridge
English documentary filmmakers
People from Sutton, London